USS Chase (DE-158/APD-54) was a  in service with the United States Navy from 1943 to 1946. She was scrapped in 1946.

History
USS Chase was named in honor of Admiral Jehu V. Chase (1869–1937). She was launched 24 April 1943 by Norfolk Navy Yard; sponsored by Mrs. J. V. Chase ; and commissioned 18 July 1943.

Battle of the Atlantic
Between 14 September 1943 and 23 November 1944, Chase escorted six transatlantic convoys between New York and Norfolk, Virginia and North African ports. During her second such crossing, while approaching Bizerte on 20 April 1944, Chase fired on attacking enemy torpedo bombers, driving them off, then rescued swimming survivors from three torpedoed merchant ships.

Chase was converted to a Charles Lawrence-class high speed transport, reclassified APD-54 on 24 November 1944, and with conversion completed, sailed from Boston on 4 February 1945 for Pacific action waters.

Pacific War
She reached Ulithi on 18 March, and next day got underway for the Okinawa operation, sailing with the group scheduled to simulate a landing on the southern coast of the island as a diversion from the main assaults. This diversion received more attention from enemy aircraft than did the main landings as they made their demonstration on 1 April. Chase joined in the blaze of anti-aircraft fire which drove the enemy off, then moved north to join the anti-submarine screen protecting the landings.

Aside from two brief voyages to Guam and Ulithi, Chase continued on the dangerous duty of patrol off Okinawa until 20 May. On 20 May, Chase fired successfully on a diving kamikaze, but had to maneuver violently to avoid the falling aircraft. It splashed, a scant  from the ship, and the explosion of the two bombs it carried ripped Chases hull open, flooding the engine and fire rooms. With her steering gear jammed at hard left rudder, Chase drove off another suicide plane. Listing so badly as to be in danger of capsizing, Chase was kept afloat by the skillful work of her crew and towed into Kerama Retto for repairs. She was later towed across the Pacific to San Diego, arriving 11 October. Here she was decommissioned 15 January 1946, and sold for scrap on 13 November 1946.

Awards
Chase received two battle stars for World War II service.

References

External links

 

 

Buckley-class destroyer escorts
Charles Lawrence-class high speed transports
World War II frigates and destroyer escorts of the United States
World War II amphibious warfare vessels of the United States
1943 ships
Ships built in Portsmouth, Virginia
Maritime incidents in May 1945